Anything is the first demo EP by Irish band the Cranberry Saw Us, later known as the Cranberries. It was self-released on cassette format. This is the only release to feature the original singer Niall Quinn. By their next release, Water Circle, Niall Quinn had been replaced by Dolores O'Riordan as lead vocalist and primary songwriter. Guitarist Noel Hogan designed the cover art. He made an error in the band's name, spelling it "The Cranbery Saw Us" on both the cover and the liner notes. The liner notes show the original sale price was £2.00 and overwritten with £2.50. There are no surnames mentioned in the liner notes.

Track listing
 "Throw Me Down a Big Stairs" (N. Quinn, M. Smyth) – 2:31
 "How's It Going to Bleed" (N. Hogan, N. Quinn) – 3:54
 "Storm in a Teacup" (N. Quinn) – 3:41
 "Good Morning God" (N. Quinn) – 2:52

Personnel
The Cranberry Saw Us
Niall Quinn – vocals, guitar
Noel Hogan – guitar, vocals
Mike Hogan – bass
Fergal Lawler – drums
Additional personnel
Jim – keyboards
Andy – harmonica
Morgan – accordion
Claire – violin

References

1990 debut EPs
The Cranberries albums
Demo albums